is a Japanese actress and voice actress. She is a member of the pop group Sorachoco. She is represented with AT Production.

Hanamura is known for her role as Yuka Nakagawa in Battle Royale.

She also held a voice actor credit as a character in Galaxy Angel Rune.

Filmography 
 Battle Royale (2000) as Yuka Nakagawa
 Nanaka 6/17 (2003) as Miko-san
 5 Centimeters Per Second (2007) as Kanae Sumida
 Tokyo Magnitude 8.0 (2009) as Mirai Onosawa
 Dareka no Manazashi (2013) as Aya Okamura
Project X Zone 2 (2015) as Mayoi Ayasato
Beyblade Burst (2016) as Katana Sakaki
Phoenix Wright: Ace Attorney − Spirit of Justice (2016) as Mayoi Ayasato
Kamiwaza Wanda (2016) as Mrs. Hina and Mrs. Kohinata

References

External links
 
 
 Yahoo Japan Profile
 Satomi Hanamura at GamePlaza-Haruka Voice Acting Database 
 Satomi Hanamura at Hitoshi Doi's Seiyuu Database

Japanese film actresses
Japanese television actresses
Japanese video game actresses
Japanese voice actresses
Living people
1984 births
20th-century Japanese actresses
21st-century Japanese actresses